The Deputy Prime Minister of Mauritius is a senior member of the Cabinet of Mauritius. The actual Deputy Prime Minister Louis Steven Obeegadoo was appointed by the President on 25 June 2020 after the resignation of Ivan Collendavelloo. The Deputy Prime Minister is the first in line to succeed the Prime Minister on a temporary basis in case the latter is out of the country, sick, resigns or dies suddenly.

Overview
According to the Constitution of Mauritius there shall be a Prime Minister and a Deputy Prime Minister who shall be appointed by the President on the advice of the Prime Minister.

The Deputy Prime Minister is the first person to hold the office of Prime Minister and head of government in case the latter is absent from Mauritius or is by reason of illness or of section 60(5) unable to perform the functions conferred on him by the Constitution. The President, by directions in writing, authorize the Deputy Prime Minister or, in his absence, some other Minister to perform those functions and that Minister may perform those functions (Acting Prime Minister) until his authority is revoked by the President.

List of deputy prime ministers

Parties

See also

 President of Mauritius
 Prime Minister of Mauritius
 Vice Prime Minister of Mauritius
 Leader of the Opposition (Mauritius)
 Government of Mauritius

References

 
Lists of political office-holders in Mauritius